EFS may refer to:

Medicine and science 
 Embryonal fyn-associated substrate, encoded by the EFS gene
 Enhancer-FACS-seq, a medical assay
 Estonian Physical Society

Technology 
 Canon EF-S lens mount
 Emergency flotation system, installed on helicopters

Computing 
 Amazon Elastic File System, a file storage service
 Electronic Filing System, of the Singapore Judiciary 
 Electronic Filing System (USPTO), of United States Patent and Trademark office
 Extent File System, used in the IRIX operating system
 Encrypting File System, the encryption subsystem of the NTFS file system

Other uses 

 Emergency Fire Service, now the South Australian Country Fire Service
 Equal Franchise Society, a defunct American women's suffrage advocacy group
 Estrada de Ferro Sorocabana, a Brazilian railway
 Exchange of futures for swaps
 Expenditure and Food Survey, of the Office for National Statistics in Great Britain
 GE Energy Financial Services, an American energy infrastructure investor
 Swedish Evangelical Mission
 Ethnological Forgery Series, a series of songs by the krautrock band Can

See also

 
 
 EF (disambiguation)
 EFSS (disambiguation)
 ESF (disambiguation)
 SEF (disambiguation)
 SFE (disambiguation)
 FSE (disambiguation)
 FES (disambiguation)